Association Sportive Nika, more commonly known as AS Nika, is a Congolese football club based in Kisangani, Tshopo province and currently playing in the Linafoot Ligue 2, the second level of the Congolese football. Their home games are played at Stade Lumumba.

History

AS Nika was founded in 1955 as FC RUBI, the name of the river which symbolizes their origin and which is found at the entrance to the city of Buta, by the students of Frères Maristes school from Buta who came to study in Kisangani.

Over time, the club has had several names ; FC Dieterein, INSS, Espoir, Electronic and from 1972 AS Nika.

Honours
Ligue de Football de Province Orientale (LIFPO)
 Winners (1): 2006
 Runners-up (1): 2010

References

External links

Football clubs in the Democratic Republic of the Congo
Association football clubs established in 1955
Kisangani
1955 establishments in the Belgian Congo